Sobralia fragrans, commonly known as the fragrant sobralia, is a species of orchid found from Mexico to tropical South America.

See also

fragrans
Orchids of Mexico
Orchids of Central America
Orchids of Belize
Orchids of South America